Anthony Daniels (born October 5, 1982) is an American politician and member of the Alabama House of Representatives, representing House District 53 since 2014. Since February 22, 2017, Daniels has served as minority leader in the state House of Representatives, leading the House Democratic Caucus. At 34, Daniels is both the youngest and first black person to hold the position in modern state history.

A resident of Huntsville, Daniels is an elementary school teacher by profession. He holds BA and MA degrees from Alabama A&M University.

References

External links
 Biographical details from Alabama House of Representatives
 Interview with Anthony Daniels on 

1982 births
20th-century African-American people
21st-century African-American politicians
21st-century American politicians
African-American state legislators in Alabama
Alabama A&M University alumni
Living people
Democratic Party members of the Alabama House of Representatives
Politicians from Huntsville, Alabama